KTMX (104.9 FM) is a radio station licensed to York, Nebraska. Owned by the Nebraska Rural Radio Association, it broadcasts a country music format branded as Max Country 104.9.

History
The station went on the air as KAWL-FM on January 6, 1971. On September 23, 1991, the station changed its call sign to the current KTMX. In 2004, the station was sold to Mark Jensen's MWB Broadcasting LLC. In February 2015, it was announced that both KTMX and KAWL had been sold to the Nebraska Rural Radio Association, pending FCC approval. The sale closed effective April 28, 2015, at a price of $1.335 million. In May 2015, shortly after the closure of the purchase, the station flipped from adult contemporary to country music as 104.9 Max Country.

References

External links

TMX
Country radio stations in the United States
Radio stations established in 1971